The Assault is a 1986 film adaptation of the novel of the same name by Harry Mulisch. The film was directed and produced by Fons Rademakers. The main character is played by both Derek de Lint (in the present) and Marc van Uchelen (as a youth), whereas Monique van de Ven plays two different roles, one after the war (his first wife) and one in the war (a woman who participated in the assault and whom he meets later the same night in a dark police cell).

Plot
In January 1945, as the Second World War in Europe is reaching its end, much of the Netherlands remains under Nazi occupation.  One night, a Nazi collaborator is shot dead on his bicycle.  The family whose house he falls down in front of moves the body in front of the neighboring house, where the Steenwijk family lives.  The Nazis, assuming that the Steenwijks killed the collaborator, execute the parents and older brother together with a large number of hostages. Burning the Steenwijks’ house to the ground, they imprison the younger brother, Anton.  The other person in his unlit cell is an older woman.  Anton can see only her mouth.  She spends the next few minutes comforting him until he is removed from the cell.

After the Netherlands are liberated from Nazi occupation, Anton remains shaken by what has happened.  The story moves between the end of World War II and the 1980s, following Steenwijk's often reluctant quest for the truth about the events of that traumatic night.

Cast
 Derek de Lint as Anton Steenwijk
 Marc van Uchelen as Young Anton Steenwijk 
 Monique van de Ven as Saskia de Graaff / Truus Coster 
 John Kraaijkamp as Cor Takes 
 Huub van der Lubbe as Fake Ploeg 
 Elly Weller as Mrs. Beumer 
 Ina van der Molen as Karin Korteweg 
 Frans Vorstman as Father Steenwijk 
 Edda Barrends as Mother Steenwijk 
 Casper de Boer as Peter Steenwijk 
 Wim de Haas as Mr. Korteweg 
 Hiske van der Linden as Young Karin Korteweg 
 Piet de Winj as Mr. Beumer 
 Akkemay Marijnissen as Sandra 
 Kees Coolen as Gerrit-Jan

Awards
The film won the 1986 Academy Award for Best Foreign Language Film, the Golden Globe Award for Best Foreign Language Film and the Golden Space Needle of the Seattle International Film Festival.

See also
 List of submissions to the 59th Academy Awards for Best Foreign Language Film
 List of Dutch submissions for the Academy Award for Best Foreign Language Film

References

External links

1986 films
Best Foreign Language Film Academy Award winners
Dutch World War II films
Films based on Dutch novels
Films based on military novels
Films set in the Netherlands
1980s Dutch-language films
1980s English-language films
Films shot in the Netherlands
1980s German-language films
Films directed by Fons Rademakers
Best Foreign Language Film Golden Globe winners
Golan-Globus films
1986 multilingual films
Dutch multilingual films